Nir Nachum (born September 2, 1983) is an Israeli football player who plays as an attacking midfielder for Maccabi Ironi Sderot.

Club career statistics
(correct as of October 2011)

References

1983 births
Living people
Israeli Jews
Israeli footballers
F.C. Ashdod players
Hapoel Marmorek F.C. players
Maccabi Sha'arayim F.C. players
Sektzia Ness Ziona F.C. players
Beitar Jerusalem F.C. players
Hapoel Ashkelon F.C. players
Maccabi Netanya F.C. players
Hapoel Tel Aviv F.C. players
Hapoel Rishon LeZion F.C. players
Hapoel Bnei Lod F.C. players
Israeli Premier League players
Liga Leumit players
Footballers from Ashdod
Association football forwards